Minuscule 214 (in the Gregory-Aland numbering), ε 1401 (Soden), is a Greek minuscule manuscript of the New Testament, on paper. Paleographically it has been assigned to the 14th century. It has marginalia.

Description 

The codex contains a complete text of the four Gospels, on 227 paper leaves (size ). The text is written in one column per page, 27 lines per page.

There is no  (titles) at the top of the pages. There is also a division according to the Ammonian Sections (no references to the Eusebian Canons).

Text 

The Greek text of the codex is a representative of the Byzantine text-type. Hermann von Soden classified it to the textual family Kr. Aland placed it in Category V.

According to the Claremont Profile Method it belongs to the textual family Kr in Luke 1. In Luke 10 and Luke 20 it belongs to Kx.

History 

It was examined by Birch and Burgon. C. R. Gregory saw it in 1886.

It is currently housed at the Biblioteca Marciana (Gr. Z 543), at Venice.

See also 
 List of New Testament minuscules
 Biblical manuscript
 Textual criticism

References

Further reading 

 

Greek New Testament minuscules
14th-century biblical manuscripts